Lunazul Tequila is a 100% blue agave tequila produced by the Tierra de Agaves company.

History
Francisco Beckmann, a former co-owner of the tequila brand José Cuervo, founded the Tierra de Agaves company in 2002. Lunazul tequila is grown, distilled, and bottled on a single estate in Tequila, Jalisco, Mexico.

Products
Lunazul Blanco
Lunazul Reposado
Lunazul Añejo
Lunazul Primero
Lunazul El Humoso

References

Tequila
Alcoholic drink brands